The Kitzler Study Book is an autograph workbook of Anton Bruckner which he wrote taking tuition with the conductor and cellist Otto Kitzler in Linz. Bruckner tried to complete his knowledge in musical form and instrumentation with Kitzler after the end of his studies  with Simon Sechter.

Description 

The workbook contains autograph sketches, comments, complete and partial compositions, which are displaying a rigorous tuition in musical formatting and instrumentation.

The first entries (pp. 1-18) are exercises in musical form: cadences and periods. They are followed (pp. 18-57) by lieder in two and three parts, and (pp. 58-218) by pieces for piano and string quartet: waltz, polka, mazurka, études, theme and variations, rondos, sonata form, etc., and the String Quartet in C minor and its additional Rondo.

The exercises in form are followed (pp. 218-250) by exercises of instrumentation, among others the orchestration of the first movement of Beethoven's Sonate pathétique (introduction and exposition, repetition and coda). These exercises are followed (pp; 251-326) by Bruckner's first orchestral compositions: the Four Orchestral Pieces (March in D minor and Three Orchestral Pieces). The volume ends with sketches for the Overture in G minor and for the Symphony in F minor.

Complete and partial compositions 
A not exhaustive list:

Edition and  performances 
Until 2015, only few of the compositions of the study book were published: the String Quartet, WAB 111 and the additional Rondo in C minor, WAB 208 (transcription allowed to Leopold Nowak), the Sonatensatz in G minor, WAB 243 (transcription allowed to Walburga Litschauer), and the Four Orchestral Pieces, WAB 96-97 (issued from a clean transcription given by Bruckner to Cyrill Hynais).

The Kitzler Study Book, which was first in possession of Bruckner's pupil Ferdinand Löwe, went later in private possession of Margarethe Mugrauer – the daughter of Josef Schalk – in Bamberg, who legated it to her daughter Traudl Kress in Munich. In 2013, the Austrian National Library was able to acquire the valuable original manuscript. In 2015, the MWV has issued a colour facsimile of the manuscript and could so provide interested people with this important source for study and scholarship.

On 30 April 2016, the Orchestergemeinschaft Nürnberg e.V. has premiered Bruckner's orchestration of the opening of the first movement of Beethoven's Sonate pathétique, WAB 266 Other performances occurred on 6 and 7 October 2017 in Austin, TX by Colin Mawby with the Austin Symphonic Orchestra, and on 14 August 2021, during the Brucknertage 2021, in the Marmorsaal of the St. Florian Monastery by Jan Latham König with the Altomonte Orchestra.

On 28 May 2016, a transcription for string orchestra of the Scherzo in G minor for string quartet was performed by Benjamin-Gunnar Cohrs with the Göttinger Barockorchester. The original version of the two Scherzos in F Major and G Minor for string quartet, WAB 209 was premiered by the Bruckners Kammermusik ensemble in Tokyo on 8 March 2019.

In 2018, a première of thirteen piano works from the Kitzler Study Book has been recorded by Ana-Marija Markovina. In 2019, Francesco Pasqualotto has recorded 21 piano works from the Kitzler Study Book, of which are 10 premiere recordings. In 2021, Todor Petrov has recorded 39 piano works from the Kitzler Study Book, of which a premiere of the March in F major, WAB 217/3, the Rondos in C minor and in D minor, WAB 222/2-3, and the first of the Five Pieces, WAB 216. In 2022, Christoph Eggner has recorded 24 piano works from the Kitzler Study Book – of which a premiere of the Rondo in G major, WAB 222/5 – on a restored Bösendorfer fortepiano that has belonged to Bruckner.

On 5 October 2019, two lieder from the Kitzler Study Book (O habt die Thräne gern, WAB 205, and Vor der schlummernden Mutter, WAB 206) were recorded during the reading Böck ist Bruckner II.

Discography 

Orchestration of the first movement of Beethoven's Sonate pathétique:
 Christian Hutter, Früjahrskonzert (30 April 2016), Orchester-Gemeinschaft Nüremberg — Orchester-Gemeinschaft Nüremberg CD, 2016
Piano works from the Kitzler Study Book:
 Ana-Marija Markovina and Rudolf Meister, Anton Bruckner (1824 - 1896), Piano Works – Hänssler Classic, HC17054, 2018 (with 13 piano works from the Kitzler Study Book)
 Francesco Pasqualotto, Bruckner Complete Piano Music – CD Brilliant Classics 95619, 2019 (with 21 piano works from the Kitzler Study Book, of which 10 premiere recordings)
 Todor Petrov, Bruckner - L'œuvre pour piano seul - CD Forgotten Records FR 1998/9, 2021 (with 39 piano works from the Kitzler Study Book, of which 18 premiere recordings)
 Christoph Eggner, Anton Bruckner - Klavierstücke aus dem Kitzler-Studienbuch  - CD Gramola 99282, 2023 (24 piano works from the Kitzler Study Book, of which a premiere recording of the Rondo in G major, WAB 222/5)
Lieder from the Kitzler Study Book:
 Böck liest Bruckner II - Anton Bruckner Briefe und Musik (5 October 2019) - CD Gramola 99237, 2020 - with lieder O habt die Thräne gern, WAB 205 and Vor der schlummernden Mutter, WAB 206 by Elisabeth Wimmer

References

Sources 
 Uwe Harten, Anton Bruckner. Ein Handbuch. , Salzburg, 1996. .
 Cornelis van Zwol, Anton Bruckner 1824–1896 – Leven en werken, uitg. Thoth, Bussum, Netherlands, 2012. 
 Anton Bruckner - Sämtliche Werke, Band XXV: Das Kitzler Studienbuch (1861-1863), facsimile, Musikwissenschaftlicher Verlag der Internationalen Bruckner-Gesellschaft, Paul Hawkshaw and Erich Wolfgang Partsch (Editors), Vienna, 2015

External links 
 
 Score of the orchestration of the Sonate pathétique, edition by Franz Scheder 
 Premiere recording of the Scherzo in F major and Scherzo in G minor for string quartet by the Bruckners Kammermusic, Katsushika Symphony Hills, Tokyo (8 March 2019) - and in better resolution from John Berky's website: Two premieres from Bruckner's "Kitzler Study Book"  
 A rendition of Bruckner's orchestration of the Sonate pathétique with Sibelius Ultimate & NotePerformer can be heard on YouTube: Beethoven/Bruckner - Pathétique Sonata Op. 13 (Orchestrated) - with score

Anton Bruckner
Compositions by Anton Bruckner